Seán Michael Webb (born 4 January 1983 in Coalisland, County Tyrone) is a Northern Irish footballer.

Career

Club career
Webb began his career with Dungannon Swifts where he came through the youth team and made his debut at 16 years old in December 1999. In September 2000 he moved to Scottish Football League club Ross County, where he initially joined the Under-19 team. He made his first team debut in August 2001 in a 2–0 win at Dumbarton and went on to make 49 league appearances, scoring one goal before signing for St Johnstone in June 2004, and made nineteen league appearances for the Saints, before moving back to Ross County in 2005, where he stayed until 2007, making a further 35 league appearances, and again scoring one goal. On 31 August 2007 he signed for English Football League Two club Accrington Stanley, initially ona four-month loan deal, which was extended to a full season permanent deal. He made league appearances in one season, and he was released at the end of the 2007–08 season. In 2008, he signed for Icelandic club Þór Akureyri.

On 23 October 2008 Webb signed for Conference North club Fleetwood Town. He made his debut two days later as a second-half substitute in the FA Cup fourth qualifying round as Fleetwood beat Nantwich Town 4–3 to reach the First Round Proper. Webb came on after 57 minutes, replacing John Hills. However that was to be his only appearance for the club, and on 14 November 2008 he was released.

Webb signed for Shamrock Rovers on 25 February 2009 . He played in the opening game in Tallaght Stadium  before being released in the summer.

In April 2012 Webb signed for Nairn County F.C. .

International career
Webb has been capped at Under-18, Under-19, Under-21 and senior levels by Northern Ireland.

He made his full international debut during Northern Irelands tour of the United States in May 2006. He played the final eight minutes in a 1–0 defeat to Uruguay as well as featuring against Romania on the same tour. He added two further caps with substitute appearances against Wales and Sweden in spring 2007. On 14 July 2007 he appeared for a Northern Ireland Select against Everton in a match to celebrate the 25th Anniversary of the Milk Cup. Although Webb's last international call-up was in early 2008, he has not been capped since 2007 when he appeared as a substitute against Sweden.

References

External links

Living people
1983 births
People from Coalisland
NIFL Premiership players
Association footballers from Northern Ireland
Association football defenders
Northern Ireland under-21 international footballers
Northern Ireland international footballers
Ross County F.C. players
St Johnstone F.C. players
Accrington Stanley F.C. players
Fleetwood Town F.C. players
Scottish Football League players
English Football League players
Shamrock Rovers F.C. players
League of Ireland players
Expatriate footballers in Iceland
Expatriate sportspeople from Northern Ireland in Iceland
Þór Akureyri players
Nairn County F.C. players
Huntly F.C. players
Clachnacuddin F.C. players
Highland Football League players
Dungannon Swifts F.C. players